A Gentleman's Guide to Graceful Living is Michael Dahlie's debut novel.

Plot introduction
The book is about a man, named Arthur Camden, who is the great-grandson of the owner of a club which is named Maidenhead Grange. The club is a beloved Catskills fly-fishing lounge. The lounge is home to the Hanover Street Fly Casters, a group that was founded in 1878 by 12 Manhattan financiers. Arther burns Maidenhead Grange to the ground. He didn't burn down the club on purpose, he did it by accident. Arthur has also destroyed his marriage and an import-export business that is owned by his family.

Reception
Mike Frechette of MostlyFiction.com reviewed the book saying "In addition to good writing, the book is also full of action. Perhaps its greatest achievement is that Dahlie elicits sympathy from the reader for a character whose social class does not easily elicit such feelings.  Although Arthur is a wealthy, white American male, many readers can appreciate a character who illustrates that the struggle for self-confidence is arduous and lifelong."

Hanet Maslin of The New York Times reviewed the book saying "A Gentleman’s Guide to Graceful Living is perhaps too polite to create a big, vulgar epiphany for Arthur. Yet at the end of these understated adventures he seems to have come a long way, even if he is merely stepping out of the confines of a New Yorker cartoon and into the real world. And the next time he packs a suitcase, figuratively speaking, there’ll be something to put inside."

The author of The Writing On The Wall, Lynne Sharon Schwartz, reviewed the book saying "Michael Dahlie's unusual and wonderful new novel, A Gentleman’s Guide to Graceful Living, is a tour de force that manages to combine mellow wisdom with wicked cleverness. The tragicomic adventures of his hero show a feckless Everyman trying to do the right thing, but constantly stumbling against an unreceptive world. Dahlie is an impressive new writer who walks a fine line between compassion and irony, optimism and despair. There were moments when I didn't know whether to laugh or cry, but I never wanted to stop reading this absorbing book."

External links
The New York Times Book Review
MostlyFiction.com Book Review
Michael Dahlie's Site

2008 American novels
W. W. Norton & Company books
Hemingway Foundation/PEN Award-winning works
2008 debut novels

References